Hasola is the oldest historic village in the immediate surroundings of Chakwal, Pakistan. The village's primary school was built in 1886, making it the oldest in the area. The Middle School was built in 1913 and Government High School Hasola was built in 1950. Lft. General Abdul Majeed Malik(r) and Lft. General Abdul Qayyom both attended these schools.

People of Hasola are mostly farmers, soldiers, and teachers. Some locals have emigrated to overseas mostly as laborers and drivers. A little number of them work in fields like engineering and surveying. The later include Basharat Ahmad, Khalid Mehmood, Nadeem Sadiq, Muhammad Jahangir, Waqas Nawaz, Engr.Saqib Nawaz, Interior Designer Anees Abbas, QS.Ehtasham Abbas, Irfan Ameer, Faisal Basharat, Arshad Mehmood.

Populated places in Chakwal District